Paul Tang Kwok-wai JP (born 13 January 1956) is a former Secretary for the Civil Service of Hong Kong.

Background
Tang graduated from University of Hong Kong in 1978. In the same year, Tang began his civil servant career in the Administrative Service.  He was appointed as Deputy Secretary for the Environment and Food in 2000. A year later, Tang was Deputy Secretary for Transport, which later became Deputy Secretary for the Environment, Transport and Works. In 2003, he began serving as Director of Social Welfare. Tang was appointed as Permanent Secretary for Economic Development and Labour (Labour) and Commissioner for Labour in 2007.  After the government re-organisating in July 2007, he served as Permanent Secretary for Labour and Welfare until 2012, which he was appointed as Secretary for the Civil Service.

References

Government officials of Hong Kong
Hong Kong civil servants
1958 births
Living people
Members of the Executive Council of Hong Kong